The 2002 FedEx Orange Bowl game was a post-season college football bowl game between the Florida Gators and the ACC champion Maryland Terrapins on January 2, 2002. Florida defeated Maryland 56–23. The game was part of the 2001–2002 Bowl Championship Series (BCS) of the 2001 NCAA Division I-A football season and was the concluding game of the season for both teams. The Orange Bowl was first played in 1935, and the 2002 game was the 68th edition of the Orange Bowl. The contest was televised in the United States on ABC.

This was Steve Spurrier's last game as coach of the Florida Gators as he resigned two days after the game.

References 

Orange Bowl
Florida Gators football bowl games
Maryland Terrapins football bowl games
Orange Bowl
Orange Bowl
January 2002 sports events in the United States